Dragiša "Buca" Pavlović (Serbian Cyrillic: Драгиша Буца Павловић; 5 October 1943 – 9 September 1996) was a Serbian and Yugoslav communist politician, known primarily as one of the top figures who publicly opposed Slobodan Milošević and tried to prevent his rise to power. Pavlović was Chairman of the City Committee of the League of Communists of Belgrade.
 

This was seen as a critic of Milošević and party politics. Milošević denounced Pavlović as being soft on Albanian radicals, contrary to advice from President Ivan Stambolić. On 23/24 September 1987, at the subsequent eighth session of the Central Committee, one that lasted around 30 hours, and was broadcast live on the state television, Milošević had Pavlović deposed, to the utter embarrassment of Ivan Stambolić, who resigned under pressure from Milošević's supporters a few days later.

Pavlović died on 9 September 1996, aged 52. His funeral was attended by only a small number of relatives and close friends, among them being Stambolić.

External links
 1987 – Trenutak istine Dragiše Pavlovića at vreme.com 

1943 births
1996 deaths
Serbian communists
League of Communists of Serbia politicians
Politicians from Kragujevac